Thomas James Matthewson (9 May 1903–1979) was an English footballer who played in the Football League for Sheffield Wednesday and South Shields.

References

1903 births
1966 deaths
English footballers
Association football forwards
English Football League players
Sheffield Wednesday F.C. players
Gateshead A.F.C. players
North Shields F.C. players